Veliko Globoko is a small village on the right bank of the Krka River in the Municipality of Ivančna Gorica in central Slovenia. The area is part of the historical region of Lower Carniola and is now included in the Central Slovenia Statistical Region.

References

External links

Veliko Globoko on Geopedia

Populated places in the Municipality of Ivančna Gorica